Rabbi Benjamin Edidin Scolnic (born October 28, 1953), is an American author who has been the spiritual leader at Temple Beth Sholom in Hamden, Connecticut since 1983.

He was educated at Columbia University and the Jewish Theological Seminary of America (JTS).  He also received his Ph.D. from JTS.

Scolnic is the model for one of the rabbinical detectives in Jacob Appel's popular murder mystery Wedding Wipeout.

Scolnic was the editor of the journal Conservative Judaism from 1993–2000.  He has taught at Yale University, the University of Connecticut, and JTS.

He served as the host for a series of The Eternal Light radio shows, which were produced by JTS.

Scolnic is the author of several books and many articles and essays on the Bible, feminism, liturgy, Jewish education, the relationship between religion and the media, and the future of Conservative Judaism.

Published books 
Theme and Context in Biblical Lists (1995), 
Chronology and Papponymy : A List of the Judean High Priests of the Persian Period, (1999), 
Are You Talking to Me? (2001), 
Shoes for the Road: Thoughts for Living in a Troubled Time (2003), 
Alcimus, Enemy of the Maccabees (2004), 
If the Egyptians Died in the Red Sea, Where are Pharaoh's Chariots? Exploring the Historical Dimension of the Bible (2005), 
Unfinished Business (2006),
Conservative Judaism and the Faces of God's Words (2006), 
Thy Brother's Blood: The Maccabees and the Morality of Kinship (2007),

References

External links 
WorldCat
Living Words

People from Hamden, Connecticut
1953 births
Living people
Jewish American writers
American Conservative rabbis
Jewish Theological Seminary of America semikhah recipients
21st-century American Jews